Imperial Violets (French:Violettes impériales) is a 1924 French silent historical film directed by Henry Roussel and starring Raquel Meller, Suzanne Bianchetti and André Roanne. It was remade by Roussel as a sound film of the same title in 1932.

The film's sets were designed by the art director Robert Gys.

Cast
 Raquel Meller as Violetta 
 Suzanne Bianchetti as Eugénie de Montijo
 André Roanne as Comte de Saint-Affremond  
 Jane Even as Comtesse de Saint-Affremond 
 Jimmy O'Kelly as Juan  
 Claude France as Mademoiselle de Perry-Fronsac  
 Roger San Juana as  Manuel  
 Robert Guilbert as Duc de Morny  
 Sylviane de Castillo as Madame de Montijo  
 Mademoiselle Farnèse as Duchesse de Mondovi 
 Daurelly as Napoleon III
 Albert Brouett as Docteur Malavert  
 Girardo as José  
 Danielle Vigneau as Petit frère de Violetta 
 Suzy Béryl as Dame d'honneur  
 Jacques Cabelli 
 Léon Courtois 
 Luc Dartagnan 
 Pierre Delmonde 
 Robby Guichard 
 Jean-Paul Le Tarare 
 Marais 
 Paulette Marchal 
 Laurent Morléas 
 Hietta Stella 
 Marie-Louise Voisin

See also
 Imperial Violets (1932)
 Imperial Violets (1952)

References

Bibliography
 Powrie, Phil & Rebillard, Éric. Pierre Batcheff and stardom in 1920s French cinema. Edinburgh University Press, 2009

External links

1924 films
Films directed by Henry Roussel
French silent films
1920s historical films
French historical films
Films set in the 1850s
Films set in Paris
Films set in Seville
Cultural depictions of Napoleon III
French black-and-white films
1920s French films